Podstene pri Kostelu  is a small village in the Municipality of Kostel in southern Slovenia. The area is part of the traditional region of Lower Carniola and is now included in the Southeast Slovenia Statistical Region.

Name
The name of the settlement was changed from Podstene to Podstene pri Kostelu in 1955.

Church
The local church is dedicated to the Holy Spirit and belongs to the Parish of Banja Loka. It dates to the late 16th or early 17th century with some 19th-century additions.

References

External links
Podstene pri Kostelu on Geopedia

Populated places in the Municipality of Kostel